Robert Linzeler (7 March 1872 – 25 January 1941) was a French sailor who represented his country at the 1900 Summer Olympics in Meulan, France. With Texier (helmsman) as helmsman and fellow crewmembers Jean-Baptiste Charcot and Texier (crew), Linzeler took the 2nd place in first race of the 0 to 0.5 ton and finished 2nd in the second race.

Further reading

References

External links
 

1872 births
1941 deaths
French male sailors (sport)
Olympic sailors of France
Sailors at the 1900 Summer Olympics – 0 to .5 ton
Medalists at the 1900 Summer Olympics
Sportspeople from Paris
Olympic silver medalists for France
Olympic medalists in sailing
Sailors at the 1900 Summer Olympics – Open class